Qutham ibn al-ʿAbbās was a cousin of Muhammad who brought Islam to the area that is now Uzbekistan. Shah-i-Zinda.

References

Family of Muhammad
Rashidun governors of Medina
Rashidun governors of Mecca
7th-century Arabs